Miroslav Koníček (born 18 April 1936) is a Czech rower who competed for Czechoslovakia in the 1960 and 1964 Summer Olympics.

He was born in Prague.

In 1960 he was the coxswain of the Czechoslovak boat which won the bronze medal in the men's eight. He was also the coxswain of the Czechoslovak boat which was eliminated in the semi-finals of the coxed four competition.

Four years later he won his second bronze medal as coxswain of Czechoslovak boat in the men's eight event.

External links
 profile

1936 births
Living people
Czech male rowers
Czechoslovak male rowers
Coxswains (rowing)
Olympic rowers of Czechoslovakia
Rowers at the 1960 Summer Olympics
Rowers at the 1964 Summer Olympics
Olympic bronze medalists for Czechoslovakia
Olympic medalists in rowing
Medalists at the 1964 Summer Olympics
Medalists at the 1960 Summer Olympics
Rowers from Prague
European Rowing Championships medalists